Locust Corner is an unincorporated community in Clermont County, in the U.S. state of Ohio.

History
Locust Corner, originally called Pleasant Hill, had its start around 1830 when the first store opened there. A post office called Locust Corner was established in 1846, and remained in operation until 1905.

References

Unincorporated communities in Clermont County, Ohio
Unincorporated communities in Ohio